Jan Vilímek (1 January 1860 – 15 April 1938) was a Czech illustrator and painter.

Vilímek was born on 1 January 1860 in Žamberk, Bohemia. He created many portraits of famous personalities from Bohemia and other Slavonic nations. During the 1880s, these portraits were regularly published in magazines such as Humoristické Listy, Zlatá Praha and Světozor. In the 1890s, some of these illustrations were assembled into a book, České album. He died on 15 April 1938 in Vienna.

External links 

 List of Vilímek's portraits on Czech Wikipedia (incomplete, sorted by source, with links to digitized images on Wikimedia Commons and external sites)

1860 births
1938 deaths
People from Žamberk
People from the Kingdom of Bohemia
19th-century Czech painters
Czech male painters
20th-century Czech painters
Czech illustrators
Czech expatriates in Austria
19th-century Czech male artists
20th-century Czech male artists